Brunhild (minor planet designation: 123 Brunhild) is a stony S-type main-belt asteroid. It was discovered by German-American astronomer C. H. F. Peters on July 31, 1872, and named after Brünnehilde, a Valkyrie in Norse mythology. Brunhild has been mistaken for the non-existent variable star KN Gem.

In 1983, 123 Brunhild was observed photometrically from the Observatoire de Haute-Provence, producing an irregular light curve that showed eight extremes, including two minima and two maxima that were more accentuated than the others. This curve indicates an irregular shape or possibly areas with higher albedo, with a rotation period of 10.04 ± 0.02 hours and a brightness variation of 0.16 ± 0.01 in magnitude.

Based upon IRAS observations, the estimated diameter of this asteroid is 47.97 ± 2.6 km with a geometric albedo of 0.2134 ± 0.026. A smaller diameter value of 41.33 ± 1.73 km is obtained from the Midcourse Space Experiment observations, with an accordingly higher albedo of 0.2886 ± 0.0247.

References

External links 

 
 

000123
Discoveries by Christian Peters
Named minor planets
000123
000123
18720731
Brunhild